James Robert Taylor (born September 9, 1959) is a former American football quarterback in the National Football League (NFL) who played for the Baltimore Colts. He played high school football at Somerset High School and college football for the SMU Mustangs and Georgia Tech Yellow Jackets.

His son Cooper Taylor also played in the NFL.

References

1959 births
Living people
Players of American football from San Antonio
American football quarterbacks
SMU Mustangs football players
Georgia Tech Yellow Jackets football players
Baltimore Colts players